The Prairie Wolf Pack is a Canadian rugby union team representing the Prairies region in the Canadian Rugby Championship. The Wolf Pack's inaugural season includes a home game at the Calgary Rugby Park against The Rock and away games at the BC Bears and Ontario Blues.

Current squad

Squad for the 2018 Canadian Rugby Championship season

Notable players

Canada

The following players have represented Canada at full international level.

Coaching history

Andy Pocock (2009)
Mike Shelley (2010)
Colin Jeffs (2011–2012)
Graeme Moffat (2013)

2018 Season (Exhibition)

° = Preseason Game

External links
 Official Website

Canadian rugby union teams
Sports teams in Calgary
Rugby union teams in Alberta
Rugby clubs established in 2009
2009 establishments in Alberta
Canadian Rugby Championship